HMS Messenger was a wooden paddle ship, built in 1824 by Benjamin Wallis at Blackwall as Duke of York, and renamed Messenger when purchased by the Royal Navy on 20 August 1830 for £12,481. Initially she was rated as a paddle packet. At around this time she was re-rated as a sloop. She passed Gibraltar in 1830, according to Earl of Beaconsfield's letters enroute to Cadiz, Spain. It was reported Benjamin Disraeli was on the boat. She was fitted as a coal depot from May–December 1840, and sold to Henry Castle & Son to be broken up on 22 November 1861.

Her sister ship, George IV, was also purchased by the Royal Navy for a total cost (including Messenger) of £24,977 9s. 4d., and renamed Hermes.

Propulsion 
After her lengthening, she was re-engined with 2 engines of 100 nominal horse power each.

Commissions 

 1830: under Lieutenant William Frederick Lapidge
 20 May 1830: under Lieutenant Benjamin Aplin, as a Falmouth packet
 May 1834: under John King as a transport
 27 July 1840: as a coal depot

References

1824 ships